The Ministry of Tourism and Creative Economy (Indonesian: Kementerian  Pariwisata dan Ekonomi Kreatif, formerly Kementerian Pariwisata) is the ministry in Indonesia concerned with administration of tourism.

History and nomenclature changes
In the 1990s, tourism was a directorate general within the Department of Tourism, Posts and Telecommunications which concerned with administration of postal and telecommunication as well., not a standalone department/ministry yet.

The department name changes to Department of Tourism, Art and Culture on Soeharto's Seventh Development Cabinet after releasing the Posts and Telecommunications responsibility to Department of Transportation. It became the State Ministry of Tourism and Art and changes to become Department of Tourism and Culture on Gus Dur's National Unity Cabinet. It became the State Ministry of Culture and Tourism during Megawati's presidency (Mutual Assistance Cabinet) and changed name again to become Ministry of Culture and Tourism during the first term of Susilo Bambang Yudhoyono's presidency (United Indonesia Cabinet). It changed into Ministry of Tourism and Creative Economy during the second term (Second United Indonesia Cabinet) of Susilo Bambang Yudhoyono presidency as the cultural responsibilities were transferred into Ministry of Education and Culture.

In 2014, the ministry name changes to become the Ministry of Tourism after President Joko Widodo announce the cabinet line up. Joko Widodo plan to spin off the Directorate General of Creative Economy into a new separate organisation which will be named Creative Economy Agency (Indonesian: Badan Ekonomi Kreatif).

Logo

See also
Visit Indonesia Year

References

External links

Tourism
Indonesia